Colombo Racecourse is a historical harness racing course in the Cinnamon Gardens, Colombo. During the Second World War, it was used as a temporary airfield. In 2012, it was redeveloped as the Colombo Racecourse Sports Complex to become the first International Rugby Union ground in Sri Lanka to host all the national rugby union side's home matches.

In 2014, the ground went through a major renovation, which included installation of floodlights and the conversion of a substantial part of the grandstand into a shopping and dining complex. The ground hosted the 2022 SAFF U-17 Championship.

History

Horse racing
Officially opened for horse racing in 1893 after it was moved from the Colpitty Race Course, as one of the best in terms of design, facilities, and size in the East. In 1922 a totalisator was installed becoming the first race course in the East to have one.

The Colombo Turf Club was based here with its own pavilion and club house next to the grand stand.

Airstrip

In late 1941, World War II began in the East. After the fall of Singapore the Royal Navy's East Indies Station was moved to Colombo and then to Trincomalee. Admiral Sir Geoffrey Layton was appointed Commander-in-Chief, Ceylon with Air Vice Marshal John D'Albiac as air officer commanding, No. 222 Group RAF which was based in Ceylon. The order was given to construct an airfield at the Colombo Racecourse. D S Senanayake, Minister of Agriculture and Lands (later the 1st Prime Minister of Ceylon) was given the task of its construction. Consisting only of a single runway, station headquarters and the officers mess were set up in the bungalows in Cinnamon Gardens and was serviced by a newly established military hospital in the premises of Royal College Colombo.

Two squadrons of the Royal Air Force where based at the racecourse. They were No. 258 Squadron RAF with Hawker Hurricanes and No. 11 Squadron RAF with Bristol Blenheims. When the Easter Sunday Raid occurred the Japanese bombed the RAF units at RAF Ratmalana yet passed over the Racecourse Airstrip without knowing it existed. This allowed the Hurricanes of No. 11 Squadron to deploy and intercept the Japanese raiders.

The Royal Navy also established a Royal Naval Air Station (RNAS) here during the duration of the war with the name HMS Bherunda. 882 Naval Air Squadron was based here.

Decline
Following the end of the war the airfield was dismantled, racecourse was reconverted back to a horse racing track. This was greatly affected after gambling and betting was banned in the country in 1956. This resulted in horse racing stopping completely in Colombo thereafter along with Nuwara Eliya Racecourse (which re-opened in 1981).

The Colombo Racecourse, the Colombo Turf Club and its grounds were taken over by the government and its large land extent was segmented and distributed to government entities. Southern parts went to the University of Colombo, the northern portion to the Department of National Archives while others to the Royal College Sports Complex, Bloomfield Cricket and Athletic Club and sporting bodies.

The Grandstand and the Colombo Turf Club building were neglected and used for different purposes. The Sri Lanka Army used it as a temporary garrison from time to time as well as the Sri Lanka Air Force used what was left racecourse grounds for landing transport helicopters.

Colombo Racecourse Sports Complex

In 2011 the Urban Development Authority commenced the renovation of the Grand stand and the Colombo Turf Club building. The structures were renovated by the 6th Engineer Services Regiment and Central Engineering Consultancy Bureau. The remaining grounds were redeveloped into Sri Lanka's first international grade Rugby Union grounds.

References

External links

1941-1945 Eastern Travels Part 4
The Battle of Ceylon - 1942
888 (PR) Naval Air Squadron

Buildings and structures in Colombo
Sports venues in Colombo
Military of British Ceylon
Airports in Sri Lanka
Defunct horse racing venues in Sri Lanka
Shopping malls in Sri Lanka
Tourist attractions in Colombo
World War II sites in Sri Lanka
1893 establishments in Ceylon